António Martins de Chaves  (died 6 July 1447) was a Cardinal of the Catholic Church. He was bishop of Porto in Portugal.

He was made cardinal on the 18 December 1439 by Pope Eugenius IV. He founded the church and hospice of San Antonio dei Portoghesi in 1440. Chaves was buried at the Archbasilica of St. John Lateran, where he was archpriest from 1444 to his death. His tomb was executed by Isaia da Pisa.

References

Bibliography
 
(in Latin), pp. 8 no. 14;  26 no. 1, 27 no. 33; 28 no. 81; 218, with note 1.

External links
Biography

15th-century Portuguese cardinals
Bishops of Porto
1447 deaths
Year of birth unknown